Xuxcab is a populated place in Yucatán, Mexico.

See also
Yaxuna

References

Populated places in Yucatán